Anatoly Ivanovich Blatov (born Ivanov, ; 11 July 1914 – 1 October 1988) was a Soviet diplomat and Communist Party official. Between 1972 and 1982 he was assistant to Leonid Brezhnev.

Blatov graduated from the Dnipropetrovsk National University of Rail Transport (1940) and Communist Party Supreme School (1945). He held the following positions:

1945–1947 – official of the Ministry of Foreign Affairs
1947–1948 – professor at the Moscow State Institute of International Relations
1948–1949 – official of the Soviet Information Bureau
1949–1954 – various positions at the Soviet Union to Germany
1955–1968 – official at the Ministry of Foreign Affairs
1968–1972 – official at the Central Committee of the Communist Party of the Soviet Union
1972–1982 – assistant to Leonid Brezhnev 
1982–1985 – official at the Central Committee of the Communist Party of the Soviet Union
1985–1988 – Ambassador of the Soviet Union to the Netherlands

References

1914 births
1988 deaths
Ambassadors of the Soviet Union to the Netherlands
Central Committee of the Communist Party of the Soviet Union candidate members
Academic staff of the Moscow State Institute of International Relations
Tenth convocation members of the Supreme Soviet of the Soviet Union
Recipients of the Order of Lenin
Recipients of the Order of the Red Banner of Labour
Recipients of the USSR State Prize
Burials at Kuntsevo Cemetery